The McAllen Texas Temple is temple of the Church of Jesus Christ of Latter-day Saints under construction in McAllen, Texas.

The intent to construct the temple was announced on October 5, 2019 by church president Russell M. Nelson in the Women's Session of the church's general conference.  The announcement also included the Freetown Sierra Leone; Orem Utah; Port Moresby Papua New Guinea; Bentonville Arkansas; Bacolod Philippines; Cóban, Guatemala; and Taylorsville Utah temples.

On December 11, 2019, the church announced that the temple will be built on a 10.6-acre site located on the northwest corner of Second Street and West Trenton Road in McAllen.  Plans call for a single-story temple of approximately 25,000 square feet, with a center spire. The temple is being built on 11 acres and stands 107 feet high.

A groundbreaking ceremony, to signify beginning of construction was held on November 21, 2020, with Art Rascon, an area seventy, presiding.

See also 

 The Church of Jesus Christ of Latter-day Saints in Texas
 List of temples of The Church of Jesus Christ of Latter-day Saints
 List of temples of the Church of Jesus Christ of Latter-day Saints by geographic region
 Comparison of temples of The Church of Jesus Christ of Latter-day Saints
 Temple architecture (LDS Church)

References

External links
McAllen Texas Temple at ChurchofJesusChristTemples.org

Proposed religious buildings and structures of the Church of Jesus Christ of Latter-day Saints
21st-century Latter Day Saint temples
Buildings and structures in McAllen, Texas
Temples (LDS Church) in Texas
Proposed buildings and structures in Texas
Buildings and structures under construction in the United States